Trung Hà may refer to several places in Vietnam, including:

Trung Hà, Haiphong, a commune of Thủy Nguyên District
Trung Hà, Tuyên Quang, a commune of Chiêm Hóa District
Trung Hà, Vĩnh Phúc, a commune of Yên Lạc District

See also
Trung Hà Bridge